Gipp is a surname. Notable people with the surname include:

 Big Gipp (Cameron Gipp, born 1973), an American rapper 
 Chuck Gipp (Charles R. Gipp, born 1947), an American politician
 David Gipp (born 1969), British footballer
 George Gipp (1895–1920), American college football player known as "the Gipper"

Fictional characters
Joe Gipp, a character in the 1987 American teen comedy film Adventures in Babysitting

See also
 Gibb, a surname
 GIP (disambiguation)
 Gipps, a surname
 Gipps (disambiguation)